Alonso Martínez de Espinar (5 May 158814 May 1682) was a Spanish courtier and one of three important writers on venery of the Spanish Baroque. He was a ballestero ("crossbowman") and arquebusier to several kings of Spain.

Life 

Martínez de Espinar was the son of Cristóbal Martínez de Espinar, of Baza in Granada, and Juana Hernández Sacristán, who was from Brunete in the province of Madrid. He was baptised in the church of San Martín in Madrid. He had a sister, Jerónima Martínez de Espinar, who married Alonso Mateos, who was ballestero to the King of Spain and the brother of Juan Mateos, author of another important book on venery.

Pictorial representations 

Martínez de Espinar appears in the original version of Prince Baltasar Carlos in the Riding School painted by Diego Velázquez at the Palacio del Buen Retiro in 1636. He is shown in the right middle ground of the picture, handing a lance to Gaspar de Guzmán, Count-Duke of Olivares, riding-master to Prince Baltasar Carlos, who will then hand it to his charge, who is on horseback in the foreground; behind Martínez de Espinar is Juan Mateos, while on a balcony of the palace stand King Philip IV and Queen Isabel.

Published work 

The Arte de ballestería y montería is one of the three principal works on venery of the Spanish Baroque period. It was published in Madrid in 1644, with a preface by Francisco de Quevedo Villegas. It is dedicated to Balthasar Charles, Prince of Asturias, and contains portrait engravings of him and of Martínez de Espinar by Juan de Noort; the other engravings, of hunting scenes, are by an unknown hand.

The book is in three parts, and – despite the title, which means roughly "the art of crossbowmanship and hunting" – deals with hunting both with the crossbow and with the arquebus; it also covers hunting with lures and traps.

A second edition was published in 1739 in Naples, which at that time was under Spanish rule; another was published by Antonio Marín in Madrid in 1761.

Gallery

Notes

References 

1588 births
1682 deaths